Torsten Voges is a German actor who appeared in The Big Lebowski, Funny People and two Rob Zombie films: The Lords of Salem as Count Gorgann and Death-Head in 31.

Filmography

References

External links

website of Torsten Voges

German male voice actors
Living people
German male film actors
German male television actors
Year of birth missing (living people)